The 2017 Real Salt Lake season was the team's 13th year of existence, and their 13th consecutive season in Major League Soccer, the top division of the American soccer pyramid.

Background

On March 20 the club announced that Head Coach Jeff Cassar had been dismissed from his duties only three games into the season. Daryl Shore was named interim head coach for the two games against the New York Red Bulls and Minnesota United. On March 29 it was announced that Mike Petke would take over the head coaching position following the game against Minnesota United on April 1.

Non-competitive

Preseason

Desert friendlies

Portland Timbers Preseason Tournament

Southern California

Friendly

Competitions

MLS regular season

Standings

Western Conference Table

Overall table

Results summary

Match results 

Originally scheduled for August 12; match postponed in 29th minute due to weather conditions. The match resumed on August 13.

U.S. Open Cup

Stats

Stats from MLS Regular season, MLS playoffs, CONCACAF Champions league, and U.S. Open Cup are all included.

Club

Roster
 Age calculated as of the start of the 2017 season.

Transfers

In

Out

Loans

In

Out

Trialist

See also 
 2017 Real Monarchs season

References

Real Salt Lake seasons
Real Salt Lake
Real Salt Lake
Real Salt Lake